Sunset is a census-designated place (CDP) in Miami-Dade County, Florida, United States. The population was 15,912 at the 2020 census. The U.S. Postal Service uses the Miami ZIP Codes of 33173 and 33183 for Sunset.

Geography
It is bordered by the communities of Kendale Lakes, Westwood Lakes, Olympia Heights, Glenvar Heights, and Kendall.

Demographics

2020 census

As of the 2020 United States census, there were 15,912 people, 4,989 households, and 3,761 families residing in the CDP.

2000 census
As of the census of 2000, there were 17,150 people, 5,488 households, and 4,505 families residing in the CDP. The racial makeup of the CDP was 91.24% White (26.1% Non-Hispanic White,) 1.51% African American, 0.11% Native American, 2.45% Asian, 2.49% from other races, and 2.20% from two or more races. Hispanic or Latino of any race were 69.69% of the population.

There were 5,488 households, out of which 36.8% had children under the age of 18 living with them, 63.9% were married couples living together, 14.0% had a female householder with no husband present, and 17.9% were non-families. 12.7% of all households were made up of individuals, and 4.3% had someone living alone who was 65 years of age or older.  The average household size was 3.10 and the average family size was 3.38.

In the CDP, the population was spread out, with 23.3% under the age of 18, 9.0% from 18 to 24, 29.6% from 25 to 44, 24.6% from 45 to 64, and 13.5% who were 65 years of age or older.  The median age was 38 years. For every 100 females, there were 91.4 males.  For every 100 females age 18 and over, there were 86.4 males.

The median income for a household in the CDP was $58,903, and the median income for a family was $66,422. Males had a median income of $39,893 versus $31,234 for females. The per capita income for the CDP was $23,735.  About 5.4% of families and 7.1% of the population were below the poverty line, including 6.9% of those under age 18 and 8.2% of those age 65 or over.

As of 2000, speakers of Spanish  as a first language accounted for 73.75% of residents, while English made up 24.03%, and French was the mother tongue of 0.63% of the population.

Transportation
The Don Shula Expressway Toll Road and Snapper Creek Expressway run through the southeast corner of Sunset.

Education
Miami-Dade County Public Schools operates public schools.

Elementary schools 
Snapper Creek Elementary School
Blue Lakes Elementary School

Middle schools 
Glades Middle School

High Schools 

Southwest Miami Senior High School

Charter Schools 
True North Classical Academy

References

Census-designated places in Miami-Dade County, Florida
Census-designated places in Florida